First International Bank (Liberia) Limited (FIB) is a commercial bank in Liberia.

(FIB) also have sub branch in Nimba County Liberia.

Overview
First International Bank is a leading financial services provider in Liberia. With headquarters in Monrovia, the bank has branches in the capital suburbs and in the provinces.

Branch Network
The known locations of branches of the First International Bank (Liberia) include the following locations:
 Main Branch - Broad Street, Monrovia
 Paynesville Branch - Redlight, Paynesville 
 Clara Town Branch - Clara Town
 Duala Branch (MIC Building. 
 Sinkor Branch (15th Street)
 Buchanan Branch (Robert Street)
 Ganta Branch (Guinea Road Junction)
 Greenville Branch (Adjacent Post Office)
 Money Gram Outlet (Logan Town Junction)
 Money Gram Outlet (Wroto Town)
 Money Gram Outlet (Duport Road)
 Money Gram Outlet (Bardnersville Junction)

See also
 Economy of Liberia
 List of banks in Liberia

References

External links
 List of Licensed Commercial Banks in Liberia

Banks of Liberia
Companies based in Monrovia